Daniella Smith (born 30 July 1972, in Kaikohe, New Zealand) is a New Zealand former professional boxer. She became the first female fighter to win an IBF title, having held the welterweight version from 2010 to 2011 and is the second New Zealand born person to win a boxing world title. Smith is also ranked pound-for-pound number one in New Zealand of all time in the Women's division.

Amateur career 
In 1999, Smith started her career as an amateur. In a space of six years she has fought in forty fights, winning multiple titles including the gold at the national championships four times. She also competed in 2002 World Championships in Turkey, even though she was not successful on winning a medal, she still won a gold medal in 2004 at the Oceania Games.

Professional career 
In 2005 Smith made her pro debut against World Kicking Champion Sue Glassey. In 2006, Smith won against Glassey for the second time, but this time to capture her first pro boxing title (vacant NZPBA Women's light middleweight title). In 2010, Smith fought for the first time as a pro outside New Zealand, winning against Jennifer Retzke in Germany and becoming the first International Boxing Federation Women's World Champion. Smith defended her title against Noni Tenge in South Africa seven months after winning the title, but lost the bout. In 2013 Smith attempted to capture her second world title against Arlene Blencowe for the vacant Women's International Boxing Association World super lightweight title and the vacant World Boxing Federation female welterweight title, but Smith was unsuccessful in capturing the titles. In 2014, Smith fought her last fight against Gentiane Lupi. This is the second time that Smith has fought Lupi, but this time for the vacant NZPBA women's lightweight title, but Smith was unsuccessful. Smith also trains corporate and amateur boxers. On 31 January 2023, it was announced that Daniella Smith will be inducted into the 2024 International Women's Boxing Hall of Fame. The induction will happen between the 6th and 7th of october 2023.

Training
In September 2016, one of Smith amateur boxers turned pro. Cheyenne Whaanga made her pro debut against kickboxer Sarah Long, winning the bout by Unanimous decision, winning all the rounds.

Awards
New Zealand Maori Sports Awards scholarship (2002)
Northland Maori Sportswoman of the Year (2007)
2019 Gladrap Boxing Hall of fame
2019 Gladrap Boxing Awards Event of the Year Nominated
2019 Gladrap Boxing Awards Commentator of the Year Nominated
2023 Te Tai Tokerau Māori Sports Awards Te Tangi a Tūkaiāia – Lifetime Achievement Award Nominated
2024 International Womens boxing hall of fame

Amateur titles
Silver Medal 75 kg New Zealand National Championship (1999)
Gold Medal 75 kg New Zealand National Championship (2000)
Gold Medal 75 kg New Zealand National Championship (2001)
Bronze Medal Oceania Championship (2002) 
Gold Medal 75 kg New Zealand National Championship (2003)
Gold Medal 75 kg New Zealand National Championship (2004)
Gold Medal 70 kg Oceania Championship (2004)

Professional titles
New Zealand Professional Boxing Association
New Zealand National female light middleweight title (2006)
New Zealand National female welterweight title (2008)
International Boxing Federation 
IBF Women's World Welterweight Title (2010)

Professional boxing record

References

|-

|-

New Zealand women boxers
1972 births
Living people
New Zealand world boxing champions
New Zealand Māori sportspeople
People from Kaikohe
People from Auckland
Welterweight boxers
Boxers from Auckland
New Zealand professional boxing champions
International Boxing Federation champions
Boxers from Northland